Raymond van Driel (born 28 July 1983) is a Dutch retired professional footballer.

Club career
His last professional club was VVV-Venlo, whom he had joined in 2007. Van Driel is a goalkeeper, who was born in Rotterdam and made his debut in professional football, being part of the AGOVV Apeldoorn squad in the 2005-06 season where he played before joining Vitesse.

He later turned to amateur football, playing for Arnhemia, RKHVV and AWC.

References

External links
 Career stats - VVV

1983 births
Living people
Footballers from Rotterdam
Association football goalkeepers
Dutch footballers
AGOVV Apeldoorn players
SBV Vitesse players
VVV-Venlo players
Eerste Divisie players